Tom Clancy's Ghost Recon 2: Summit Strike is the expansion to Tom Clancy's Ghost Recon 2. There are several minor differences between Tom Clancy's Ghost Recon 2: Summit Strike, and Tom Clancy's Ghost Recon 2, the most notable being the difficulty, as former being regarded as the harder of the two. Other differences would include new multiplayer modes, such as "Heli Hunt". The game is exclusive to the Xbox.

Plot
In 2012, Pakistani terrorist and arms dealer Asad Rahil began to sell old Soviet weaponry to fundamentalists in the Middle East through corrupt contacts in the Kazakhstan military. When the Kazakh president found out about this, he and his security council attempted to shut them down. As a response, Rahil assassinated the president and his security council in a bombing attack on Almaty, Kazakhstan. A couple weeks before the bombing, Rahil moved his troops to Kyrgyzstan, where he attempted to steal chemical weapons at a disposal facility in Oshkek. When local militia tried to stop him, Rahil detonated gas shells at the facility, killing the militia and over 500 civilians. After this, Rahil moved his troops into Almaty where he set off the bomb. After the bombing, the Kazakh military broke apart into multiple factions fighting for control of the government. UN peacekeeping troops are deployed into Kazakhstan and Kyrgyzstan to prevent an outbreak of a civil war.

The UN deploys the Ghosts, led by Captain Mitchell, to capture or kill Rahil and eliminate his forces in the region. The ghosts are tasked to work with Gregoriy Koslov, a Kazakh military specialist working with the UN to take down the corrupt military elements. Their first mission is to destroy an old Soviet military instillation Rahil is using as a base of operations. They clear a village near the base of enemy soldiers and destroy artillery pieces guarding it. They then successfully clear the base of Rahil's troops after destroying nearby SAM sites. Afterwards, Mitchell and his team kill one of Rahil's top lieutenants and destroy his training camps, but several of Koslovs troops are captured by enemy forces. The Ghosts travel to another one of Rahil's bases where Koslovs men are being kept. They successfully secure the prisoners and the base, as well as eliminating an enemy armor convoy.

Eventually, Rahil's army attacks Astana in an attempt to capture the capital and establish power. The Ghosts are sent to destroy enemy armored reinforcements traveling to the capital and destroy another armor battalion before they can ambush UN troops. Despite these setbacks, Rahal's forces take Astana, and the UN troops and Kazakh loyalists prepare a full-scale assault of the city. Mitchell and his team destroy enemy bunkers East of the capital to prevent reinforcements from reaching the city. UN troops assault Astana in an attempt to capture Rahil. The Ghosts are sent into the city to secure the crash sites of a Predator UAV and a downed Kazakh loyalist helicopter. After completing this, Mitchell and his forward team work with UN troops to take back the city.

After taking back the city, Mitchell gets word that one of his teams has been ambushed by Rahil's troops. Mitchell goes in alone while the rest of his team stays with Koslov to search for Rahil. Mitchell eventually eliminates the enemy attackers and rescues his team. Rahil's army retreats from the capital and is spread throughout the Badlands. The Ghosts work with UN troops to take back a satellite launch facility from a large enemy force. They find no sign of Rahil but find out that Koslov may be engaging him. Koslov disobeys Mitchell's orders and attacks Rahils forces without the Ghosts. The ghosts are sent to help Koslov but are then sent to secure an old Soviet nuclear storage facility to prevent Rahil from getting his hands on weapons-grade Uranium. The Ghosts prevent Rahil's forces from escaping with the Uranium, but fail to capture Rahil himself. They also discover that Koslov and his men were killed by Rahil's men.

UN forces learn of Rahils hiding place, and they find him and his remaining forces trapped in a fortress, where he faces off against the UN troops in a final battle. One of Mitchell's teams guards the canyon to prevent Rahil's forces from escaping. The Ghosts then help UN troops pinned down by enemy forces leaving the fortress. The Ghosts and UN forces assault the fortress in an attempt to capture Rahil. Rahil tries to escape with a platoon of his troops guarding him, but Mitchell and his team defeat his soldiers and kill Rahil in a final standoff. 3 months after the bombing attack, the Kazakh military is finally put back together and the country celebrates the first elections since the attack. Mitchell and the Ghosts finally leave Kazakhstan after visiting Koslovs grave.

Reception

Summit Strike was met with positive reception upon release; GameRankings gave it a score of 83.49%, while Metacritic gave it 84 out of 100.

References

External links
 
 

2005 video games
Multiplayer and single-player video games
Red Storm Entertainment games
Tom Clancy games
 02.1
Ubisoft games
Video game expansion packs
Video games developed in the United States
Video games set in 2012
Video games set in Kazakhstan
Xbox games
Xbox-only games